In Your House 13: Final Four was the 13th In Your House professional wrestling pay-per-view (PPV) event produced by the World Wrestling Federation (WWF, now WWE). The event was presented by Western Union and took place on February 16, 1997, at the UTC Arena in Chattanooga, Tennessee. Five matches were broadcast on the PPV portion, with one match held before the event as a dark match.

The main event was a four corners elimination match for the WWF Championship, which had been vacated by Shawn Michaels three days before the event. The match, which had originally been conceived to settle the controversy over the finish of the Royal Rumble match in January and name a number one contender for the championship at WrestleMania 13, featured Bret Hart, Stone Cold Steve Austin, The Undertaker, and Vader. The main matches on the undercard were Owen Hart and The British Bulldog versus Doug Furnas and Phil Lafon and Rocky Maivia versus Hunter Hearst Helmsley for the WWF Intercontinental Championship.

Production

Background
In Your House was a series of monthly pay-per-view (PPV) shows first produced by the World Wrestling Federation (WWF, now WWE) in May 1995. They aired when the promotion was not holding one of its then-five major PPVs (WrestleMania, King of the Ring, SummerSlam, Survivor Series, and Royal Rumble), and were sold at a lower cost. In Your House 13: Final Four took place on February 16, 1997, at the UTC Arena in Chattanooga, Tennessee. The name of the show was based on the event's main event match, which was a four corners elimination match.

Storylines

Main event background

The main angle entering this edition of In Your House was, initially, the resolution to the Royal Rumble match from the previous pay-per-view; the controversial ending of the match featured four wrestlers whose feuds became intertwined as a result.

The first feud was that between Bret Hart and Stone Cold Steve Austin, which had been brewing since shortly after Austin won the 1996 King of the Ring crown. Hart, at the time, had taken a leave of absence from the company following his WWF Championship loss to Shawn Michaels in an Iron Man Match at WrestleMania XII and the possibility existed that he might not return to the WWF (he had been negotiating with, and had received a contract offer from, World Championship Wrestling and was said to be considering leaving). Austin began berating Hart in his absence trying to goad him into a match. Hart would eventually return at Survivor Series in November 1996 and defeat Austin.

The other feud was between The Undertaker and his former manager Paul Bearer, who had turned on him at SummerSlam in August 1996. Vader, who had joined the WWF in 1996, was drawn into said feud when Bearer interfered in their match at the Royal Rumble and began managing Vader.

The winner of the Royal Rumble match, as is almost always the case, was to face the WWF Champion in the main event of WrestleMania 13 in Chicago in March 1997. In this particular instance, the Royal Rumble winner would face the winner of the main event of the pay-per-view where reigning champion Sycho Sid defended his title against Michaels, from whom he had wrested the title at Survivor Series. All four of the previously mentioned wrestlers were entered into the match.

The match turned with seven wrestlers remaining, with the aforementioned four wrestlers being joined by Mankind, Terry Funk, and Diesel. After Mankind and Funk had been eliminated, the two began scuffling on the far side of the ring near where official Jim Korderas was standing. Mike Chioda, who was standing on the side of the ring near the broadcast position, ran over to assist in breaking up the fight. Hart then moved in on Austin, who had just finished giving Diesel a Lou Thesz press, and tossed him from the ring to the floor. 

After Austin stood back up, he noticed the referees were still on the side of the ring tending to the brawling Funk and Mankind, which was the opposite side of the ring from where he had been tossed. Realizing that neither Korderas or Chioda had seen him touch the floor, Austin got back in the ring. Once he did, he pushed Vader and Undertaker, who were tangled in the ropes trying to eliminate each other, over the top to the floor. Hart eliminated Diesel shortly thereafter and believed he had won, and thus did not see Austin attack him from behind and toss him over the top. Austin was declared the winner of the match, which caused an infuriated Hart to assault both referees afterward. 

The next night on Monday Night Raw, Hart came out unexpectedly at the start of the program and expressed his frustration over what he perceived as constant mistreatment since he had returned from his self-imposed exile following his loss to Michaels at WrestleMania XII. Hart directed his attention to Vince McMahon at ringside as he was set to take his broadcast position, demanding that he be given the WrestleMania championship match, where he would face Michaels in a rematch of their contest from the previous year (Michaels having regained the championship from Sid in the main event of the pay-per-view), since he had been the last legal man in the Rumble when the match ended. McMahon ignored Hart’s demand, and the three-time WWF champion responded by quitting and storming out of the ring. 

A short time later, WWF President Gorilla Monsoon came out to clarify the situation. He confirmed Austin’s victory in the Royal Rumble, citing the longstanding Federation policy of referees’ decisions being final. However, Austin’s win did not mean he was guaranteed the title shot due to his actions in attaining the victory.

Instead, a match was conceived for the February event to settle the dispute. Austin, Undertaker, and Vader would compete in what was called the Final Four match, with the fourth spot in the match offered to Hart if he reconsidered his quitting earlier, which he did. The match would be conducted under elimination rules, with the last man standing advancing to WrestleMania to face the champion. However, an incident involving Michaels would lead to a significant change in plans for the pay-per-view. 

As Bret Hart recalled, the plan was for him to face Michaels in a rematch of their classic at WrestleMania XII in 1996. In that match, Hart was supposed to defeat Michaels for the WWF Championship as a reward for agreeing to lose the year before. However, on a special Thursday edition of Raw that aired on February 13, 1997, Michaels announced that he was vacating the championship. 

Several weeks earlier he had wrestled Hart and Sid and suffered a knee injury; Michaels revealed that doctors had told him that the damage was severe enough that he would likely have to retire from wrestling. He also said that he had “lost (his) smile” and needed to find it again, and thus he was walking away for a spell. Hart was said to be furious with the situation; he believed that Michaels was only doing this so he could get out of having to lose the belt to him as they had agreed upon and that the injury was not as bad as he was letting on. 

Whatever his reasoning actually was, Michaels’ decision forced a change in plans. First, the Final Four match would now be contested for the vacant WWF Championship and Sid would remain the #1 contender for the title. Then, on the edition of Raw on February 17, the winner of the Final Four match would be obligated to make his first defense of the WWF Championship against Sid in the main event of the program.

Other feuds
The other major feuds heading into the pay-per-view event were between Rocky Maivia and Hunter Hearst Helmsley over the WWF Intercontinental Championship. On Thursday Raw Thursday, Maivia defeated Helmsley to win the Intercontinental title in an upset at the time, with Maivia scoring a small package on Helmsley culminating in a rematch for Maivia's newly won Intercontinental title, and Owen Hart and The British Bulldog against Doug Furnas and Phil LaFon over the WWF Tag Team Championship which began after Furnas and LaFon had eliminated Tag Champions from a Survivor Series match at Survivor Series 1996 to earn a title shot.

Event 

Before the event went live on pay-per-view, The Godwinns defeated The Headbangers in a dark match.

Preliminary matches
The first televised match was between Marc Mero and Leif Cassidy. Mero began with a quick assault on Cassidy before getting distracted by Sable. Cassidy regrouped and applied the figure four leglock on Mero and also argued with Sable, who was in Mero's corner. Mero tried to do quick attacks on Cassidy but Cassidy managed to be on the offensive. Sable continued to distract him throughout the match and Cassidy was frustrated of her interferences. He ran before her before Mero hit Cassidy with a Wild Thing for the win.

The second match was a six-man tag team match featuring Nation of Domination (Faarooq, Crush and Savio Vega) against Bart Gunn, Goldust and Flash Funk. All the six men began brawling with each other, until Nation were sent to the outside. As they regrouped, Funk dived from the top rope onto all the three members of Nation. Funk hit a hurricanrana on Vega from the top rope and tried to dive on the Nation again but they controlled his landing and dragged him into the ring. Faarooq, Crush and Vega took turns and attacked Funk. After a great damage, he was able to tag with Gunn who took care of all three men. Gunn, Goldust and Funk sent Nation outside the ring and Gunn hit a diving bulldog on Faarooq and went for the cover but the referee was distracted in sending Goldust and Funk to the outside. Crush took advantage and hit a leg drop on Gunn while Faarooq pinned Gunn to get the win.

The third match was for the WWF Intercontinental Championship between champion Rocky Maivia and Hunter Hearst Helmsley. Helmsley gained the early advantage by performing backbreakers and suplexes on Maivia. Helmsley began applying submission holds on Maivia but Maivia countered them into a small package. Helmsley kicked out of the pin until Maivia hit a flying crossbody on Helmsley. He kicked out again and nailed Maivia with a jawbreaker and a DDT. Goldust came to the ringside and distracted Helmsley. Maivia hit a Bridging German suplex on Helmsley and pinned him to retain the IC title. Following the match, as Goldust confronted Helmsley, Marlena was assaulted and choked by a female fan at ringside, who was later identified as Helmsley's new bodyguard/enforcer, Chyna. 

The fourth match was a tag team match pitting Doug Furnas and Phil LaFon against WWF Tag Team Champions Owen Hart and The British Bulldog for the WWF Tag Team Championship. Hart and Furnas started the match as Furnas hit Owen with a lariat and a leg drop. Furnas tagged in with LaFon while Owen tagged in with Bulldog. He overpowered LaFon and then Owen and Bulldog took turns by tagging with each other and attacking LaFon. Smith did a pinfall attempt on LaFon but the referee was distracted by Owen. Owen continued to distract the referee as accidentally hit Bulldog with a lariat. Bulldog hit Owen with a lariat and the two argued as LaFon hit a splash on Owen from the top rope but Bulldog controlled LaFon. Despite that, LaFon tagged in with Furnas and then the challengers double-teamed Hart until Hart tagged in with Bulldog. Bulldog picked up LaFon and went for a running powerslam until Hart hit LaFon with his Slammy statuette. LaFon and Furnas won the match by disqualification, but the title does not change hands by DQ, so the titles remained with Hart and Bulldog.

Main event
The main event was the Final Four match for the vacant WWF Championship between The Undertaker, Bret Hart, Stone Cold Steve Austin and Vader. As mentioned, this was a no-disqualification match. In order to be eliminated a wrestler could be pinned, forced to submit, or thrown over the top rope with both feet touching the floor.  Hart and Austin, who had a well-known rivalry, started brawling with each other while Undertaker attacked Vader and hit him with a crossbody over the top rope. Undertaker attacked both Hart and Vader. Vader recovered and then hit Undertaker with a steel chair to the outside. Undertaker blocked the chair and drove Vader in the chair and then the steel steps opening up a cut above his right eye. Austin bumped Hart and then began working on Undertaker while Hart and Vader punched each other. All the four men began wrestling on outside as Undertaker crotched Austin. Vader attacked Hart with a steel chair. Undertaker began working on Hart, who eye raked Undertaker and was powerslammed by Undertaker. Vader and Austin attacked each other by hitting steel chairs, steps, bell and even a camera man. Vader applied Hart's own maneuver Sharpshooter on him, but Austin hit Vader with a Lou Thesz Press to break the hold. Vader tried to hit Undertaker a Vaderbomb, but instead went a Vadersault which missed. Hart then put Austin in a fireman's carry and threw him over the top rope, which eliminated him from the match. Hart and Undertaker brawled with each other while Vader recovered in the corner. Paul Bearer interfered and attacked Undertaker while Vader was superplexed by Hart. Despite being eliminated, Austin interfered in the match and attacked Hart. Vader went for a Vaderbomb from the top rope, but Undertaker low blowed Vader and threw him over the top rope. Undertaker and Hart remained the final two participants. He tried to hit a "Tombstone" on Hart until Austin distracted Undertaker while Hart clotheslined Undertaker over the top rope to win his fourth WWF Championship.

Aftermath 

After In Your House, Vader and Undertaker’s feud came to an end while Austin and Hart’s continued. 

In his mandatory defense against Sid on Raw, Hart lost the WWF Championship after Austin interfered and attacked him while Hart had the challenger locked in the Sharpshooter. Sid pinned Bret with a power bomb and won his second WWF Championship. Shortly thereafter, The Undertaker was given the #1 contender status and a match between him and Sid was signed for WrestleMania. 

A frustrated Hart issued a challenge to Austin for WrestleMania, wanting to face him in a submission match. Austin accepted the challenge. Hart later received a rematch against Sid for the title in a steel cage match on March 17, and both men’s WrestleMania opponents played a role in its outcome. Austin interfered on Hart’s behalf, as he wanted an opportunity to wrestle for the WWF Championship. Undertaker, meanwhile, wanted Sid to retain the championship so he could have his title match at WrestleMania. It was Undertaker’s interference that made the difference, as he slammed the cage door on Hart as he attempted to walk out and enabled Sid to escape. 

While the steel cage was being dismantled, Vince McMahon attempted to interview Hart. Hart grabbed the microphone from McMahon, shoved him to the canvas, and launched into an expletive-laced tirade as his frustrations finally boiled over. This eventually resulted in Sid, Austin, and Undertaker returning to ringside where the four men began brawling. 

Hart and Austin wrestled their regularly scheduled submission match at WrestleMania 13 with UFC fighter Ken Shamrock as guest referee for the match. Hart won the match after Austin passed out while locked in the Sharpshooter, refusing to submit despite heavy blood loss and the pain from the hold. The match ended with a double-turn as Austin turned babyface and Hart turned heel and reformed the Hart Foundation with Owen Hart, British Bulldog, Jim Neidhart and Brian Pillman who feuded with Austin. Later that night, Undertaker and Sid battled for Sid's WWF Championship in a no disqualification match. The newly heel turned Hart interfered in the match and helped Undertaker in defeating Sid for his second WWF Championship.

Results

References

External links 
 In Your House 13: Final Four results at Online World of Wrestling

13: Final Four
Professional wrestling in Tennessee
1997 in Tennessee
Events in Tennessee
1997 WWF pay-per-view events
February 1997 events in the United States